Artem Ruslanovych Umanets (born 3 May 2002) is a Ukrainian professional footballer who plays as a right winger for Ukrainian Second League club Rubikon Kyiv, on loan from Vorskla Poltava.

References

External links
 
 

2002 births
Living people
Footballers from Donetsk
Ukrainian footballers
Association football forwards
FC Vorskla Poltava players
FC Rubikon Kyiv players
Ukrainian Second League players